Kamaladevi Chattopadhyay (3 April 1903 – 29 October 1988) was an Indian social reformer and freedom activist. She was most remembered for her contribution to the Indian independence movement; for being the driving force behind the renaissance of Indian handicrafts, handlooms, and theatre in independent India; and for upliftment of the socio-economic standard of Indian women by pioneering the co-operation. She is the first lady in India to stand in elections from Madras Constituency although she lost in the elections but she pioneered the path for the women in India.

Several cultural institutions in India today exist because of her vision, including the National School of Drama, Sangeet Natak Akademi, Central Cottage Industries Emporium, and the Crafts Council of India. She stressed the significant role which handicrafts and cooperative grassroot movements play in the social and economic upliftment of the Indian people. To this end she withstood great opposition both before and after independence from the power centres.

In 1974, she was awarded the Sangeet Natak Academy Fellowship, the highest honour conferred by the Sangeet Natak Academy, India's National Academy of Music, Dance & Drama. She was conferred with Padma Bhushan and Padma Vibhushan by Government of India in 1955 and 1987 respectively. She is known as Hatkargha Maa for her works in handloom sector.

Biography

Early life
Born in a Saraswat Brahmin family on 3 April 1903 in Mangaluru, Karnataka, Kamaladevi was the fourth and youngest daughter of her parents. Her father, Ananthayya Dhareshwar, was the District Collector of Mangalore, and her mother, Girijabai, from whom she inherited an independent streak, belonged to a land-owning Chitrapur Saraswat brahmana family from coastal Karnataka. Kamaladevi's paternal grandmother was well-versed in the ancient Indian epics and puranas, and Girijabai was also well-educated, although mostly home-tutored. Together, their presence in the household gave Kamaladevi a firm grounding and provided benchmarks to respect for her intellect as well as her voice, something that she came to be known for in the future.

Kamaladevi was an exceptional student and also exhibited qualities of determination and courage from an early age. Her parents befriended many prominent freedom fighters and intellectuals such as Mahadev Govind Ranade, Gopal Krishna Gokhale, and women leaders like Ramabai Ranade, and Annie Besant. This made young Kamaladevi an early enthusiast of the swadeshi nationalist movement.

She studied about the ancient Sanskrit drama tradition of Kerala - Kutiyattam, from its greatest Guru and authority of Abhinaya, Nātyāchārya Padma Shri Māni Mādhava Chākyār by staying at the Guru's home at Killikkurussimangalam.

Tragedy struck early in life when her elder sister and best friend Saguna, whom she considered a role model, died in her teens, soon after her early marriage, and when she was just seven years old her father died as well. To add to her mother Girijabai's trouble, he died without leaving a will for his vast property, so according to property laws of the times, the entire property went to her stepson (Kamaladevi's half brother), and they only got a monthly allowance. Girijabai defiantly refused the allowance and decided to raise her daughters on her dowry property.

Her rebellious streak was visible even as a child when young Kamaladevi questioned the aristocratic division of her mother's household, and preferred to mingle with her servants and their children wanting to understand their life as well. She was a great freedom fighter.

First marriage and widowhood
She got married in 1917 at the age of 14, but was widowed two years later.

1920s

Marriage to Harindranath
Meanwhile, studying in Queen Mary's College in Chennai, she came to know Suhasini Chattopadhyay, a fellow student and the younger sister of Sarojini Naidu, who later introduced Kamaladevi to their talented brother, Harindranath Chattopadhyay (née Harin), by then a well-known poet-playwright-actor. It was their mutual interest in the arts, which brought them together.

Finally, when she was twenty years old, Kamaladevi married Harin, much to the opposition of the orthodox society of the times, which was still heavily against widow marriage. Their only son Rama was born in the following year.
Harin and Kamaladevi stayed together to pursue common dreams, which wouldn't have been possible otherwise, and in spite of many difficulties, they were able to work together, to produce plays and skits.

Later she also acted in a few films, in an era when acting was considered unsuitable for women from respectable families. In her first stint, she acted in two silent films, including the first silent film of Kannada film industry, Mricchakatika (Vasantsena) (1931), based on the famous play by Shudraka, also starring Yenakshi Rama Rao, and directed by pioneering Kannada director, Mohan Dayaram Bhavnani. In her second stint in films she acted in a 1943 Hindi film, Tansen, also starring K. L. Saigal and Khursheed, followed by Shankar Parvati (1943), and Dhanna Bhagat (1945).

Eventually, after many years of marriage, they parted ways amicably. Kamaladevi broke a tradition by filing for divorce.

Move to London
Shortly after their marriage, Harin left for London, on his first trip abroad, and a few months later Kamaladevi joined him, where she joined Bedford College, University of London, and later she received a diploma in Sociology.

Call of the freedom movement
While still in London, Kamaladevi came to know of Mahatma Gandhi's Non-Cooperation Movement in 1923, and she promptly returned to India, to join the Seva Dal, a Gandhian organisation set up to promote social upliftment. Soon she was placed in charge of the women's section of the Dal, where she got involved in recruiting, training and organising girls and women of all ages women across India, to become voluntary workers, 'sevikas'.

In 1926, she met the suffragette Margaret E. Cousins, the founder of All India Women's Conference (AIWC), who inspired her to run for the Madras Provincial Legislative Assembly. Thus she became the first woman to run for a legislative seat in India. Though she could campaign for only a few days, she lost by a small margin of 55 votes.

The All-India Women's Conference
In the following year, she became a founding member of the All-India Women's Conference (AIWC) and was its first Organizing Secretary. In the following years, AIWC grew up to become a national organisation of repute, with branches and voluntary programs run throughout the nation, and work steadfastly for legislative reforms. During her tenure, she travelled extensively to many European nations and was inspired to initiate several social reform and community welfare programs, and set up educational institutions, run for the woman, and by women. Another shining example in this series was the formation of Lady Irwin College for Home Sciences, one of its kind college for women of its times, in New Delhi.

1930s
Later she was a part of the seven member lead team, announced by Mahatma Gandhi, in the famous Salt Satyagraha (1930), to prepare Salt at the Bombay beachfront, the only other woman volunteer of the team was Avantikabai Gokhale. Later in a startling move, Kamaladevi went up to a nearby High Court, and asked a magistrate present there whether he would be interested in buying the "Freedom Salt" she had just prepared.

On 26 January 1930 she gained widespread media attention when in a scuffle, she clung to the Indian tricolour to protect it.

1940s
When World War II broke out Kamaladevi was in England, and she immediately began a world tour to represent India's situation to other countries and drum up support for Independence after the war.

While on this tour she journeyed across the southern United States. In 1941 she boarded a segregated train. In Louisiana, a conductor tried to remove her from a car reserved for white passengers. Upon realizing that she was not a Black American, the conductor reportedly grew confused about how he should proceed and asked her where she was from. To her first answer, "New York," he pressed to learn "which land [she hailed] from," to which she reportedly responded: “It makes no difference. I am a colored woman obviously and it is unnecessary for you to disturb me for I have no intention of moving from here.” The conductor left her sitting in that train car.

Post-independence work
Independence of India, brought Partition in its wake, and she plunged into rehabilitation of the refugees. Her first task was to set up the Indian Cooperative Union to help with rehabilitation, and through the Union she made plans for a township on cooperative lines. At length Jawahar Lal Nehru reluctantly gave her permission on the condition that she did not ask for state assistance, and so after much struggle, the township of Faridabad was set up, on the outskirts of Delhi, rehabilitating over 50,000 refugees from the Northwest Frontier. She worked tirelessly in helping the refugees to establish new homes and new professions; for this they were trained in new skills. She also helped set up health facilities in the new town.

Thus began the second phase of her life's work in rehabilitation of people as well as their lost crafts. She was considered singlehandedly responsible for the great revival of Indian handicrafts and handloom, in the post-independence era, and is considered her greatest legacy to modern India.

1950s and beyond
Around this time she became concerned at the possibility that the introduction of Western methods of Factory-based(machinary) mass production in India as part of Nehru's vision for India's development would affect traditional artisans, especially women in the unorganised sectors. She set up a series of crafts museums to hold and archive India's indigenous arts and crafts that served as a storehouse for indigenous know how. This included the Theater Crafts Museum in Delhi.

She equally promoted arts and crafts, and instituted the National Awards for Master Craftsmen, and the culmination of her enterprising spirit led to the setting up of Central Cottage Industries Emporia throughout the nation to cater to the tastes of a nation, rising to its ancient glory.

In 1964 she started the Natya Institute of Kathak and Choreography (NIKC), Bangalore, under the aegis of Bharatiya Natya Sangh, affiliated to the UNESCO. Its present director is famous danseuse Maya Rao.

Chattopadhyay was a woman ahead of her times, she was instrumental in setting up the All India Handicrafts Board, she was also its first chairperson. The Crafts Council of India was also the first president of the World Crafts Council, Asia Pacific Region.

Chattopadhyay also set up the National School of Drama and later headed the Sangeet Natak Akademi, and also a member of UNESCO. Her acclaimed autobiography, Inner Recesses and Outer Spaces: Memoir was published in 1986. She died on 29 October 1988 in Bombay, aged 85.

Awards and recognition

The Government of India conferred on her the Padma Bhushan in 1955, and the Padma Vibhushan in 1987, which are among the most revered civilian awards of the Republic of India. She was awarded the Ramon Magsaysay Award in 1966 for Community Leadership. In 1974, she was awarded the Sangeet Natak Akademi Fellowship, Ratna Sadasya, in recognition of her lifetime's work. The Fellowship is the highest award of Sangeet Natak Akademi, India's National Academy of Music, Dance and Drama.

UNESCO honoured her with an award in 1977 for her contribution towards the promotion of handicrafts. Shantiniketan honoured her with the Desikottama, its highest award.

On 3 April 2018, on what would have been her 115th birthday, Google honoured her with a Doodle on their homepage.

Books by Kamaladevi Chattopadhyay
 The Awakening of Indian women, Everyman's Press, 1939.
 Japan-its weakness and strength, Padma Publications 1943.
 Uncle Sam's empire, Padma publications Ltd, 1944.
 In war-torn China, Padma Publications, 1944.
 Towards a National theatre, (All India Women's Conference, Cultural Section. Cultural books), Aundh Pub. Trust, 1945.
 America,: The land of superlatives, Phoenix Publications, 1946.
 At the Cross Roads, National Information and Publications, 1947.
 Socialism and Society, Chetana, 1950.
 Tribalism in India, Brill Academic Pub, 1978, .
 Handicrafts of India, Indian Council for Cultural Relations & New Age International Pub. Ltd., New Delhi, India, 1995. .
 Indian Women's Battle for Freedom. South Asia Books, 1983. .
 Indian Carpets and Floor Coverings, All India Handicrafts Board, 1974.
 Indian embroidery, Wiley Eastern, 1977.
 India's Craft Tradition, Publications Division, Ministry of I & B, Govt. of India, 2000. .
 Indian Handicrafts, Allied Publishers Pvt. Ltd, Bombay India, 1963.
 Traditions of Indian Folk Dance.
 The Glory of Indian Handicrafts, New Delhi, India: Clarion Books, 1985.
 Inner Recesses, Outer Spaces: Memoirs, 1986. .

Books on Kamaladevi Chattopadhyay
 Sakuntala Narasimhan, Kamaladevi Chattopadhyay. New Dawn Books, 1999. . 
 S.R. Bakshi, Kamaladevi Chattopadhyaya : Role for Women's Welfare, Om, 2000, .
 Reena Nanda, Kamaladevi Chattopadhyaya: A Biography (Modern Indian Greats), Oxford University Press, USA, 2002, .
 Jamila Brij Bhushan, Kamaladevi Chattopadhyaya – Portrait of a Rebel, Abhinav Pub, 2003. .
 M.V. Narayana Rao (Ed.), Kamaladevi Chattopadhyay: A True Karmayogi. The Crafts Council of Karnataka: Bangalore. 2003
 Malvika Singh, The Iconic Women of Modern India – Freeing the Spirit. Penguin, 2006, .
 Jasleen Dhamija, Kamaladevi Chattopadhyay, National Book Trust, 2007. 
Indra Gupta , India's 50 Most Illustrious Women. .

References

Further reading
 Kamaladevi Chattopadhyay: A Biography, by Reena Nanda. New Delhi: Oxford University Press, 2002.
 Vinay Lal, A Beautiful Mind: Looking back at the life of Kamaladevi Chattopadhyay, Indian Express, 25 October 2015.
 Devaki Jain, A Singular Woman, The Caravan, 1 July 2015.

External links
 
 

Recipients of the Padma Vibhushan in social work
Recipients of the Padma Bhushan in social work
1903 births
1988 deaths
Women Indian independence activists
Indian rebels
Writers from Mangalore
Recipients of the Sangeet Natak Akademi Fellowship
Gandhians
Indian cooperative organizers
Mangaloreans
Indian arts administrators
Indian art writers
Kalakshetra Foundation alumni
Indian social reformers
Indian independence activists from Karnataka
Indian people of World War II
Indian women of World War II
Military personnel from Karnataka
20th-century Indian women writers
20th-century Indian women scientists
20th-century Indian educational theorists
Businesswomen from Karnataka
20th-century Indian businesspeople
Indian women educational theorists
Indian political writers
Indian women political writers
Indian artisans
Women writers from Karnataka
Women scientists from Karnataka
Indian social sciences writers
20th-century Indian non-fiction writers
Educators from Karnataka
Women educators from Karnataka
Konkani people
Businesspeople from Mangalore
20th-century women educators